Russia announced its intent to bid for the FIFA World Cup in early 2009, and submitted its request to FIFA in time. Russia's President Vladimir Putin has taken a keen interest in the bid and has gone so far as ordering Vitaly Mutko, the Minister of Sports, to "prepare a bid for Russia to hold the 2018 World Cup". According to a report earlier submitted by Vitaly Mutko, who also served that time as President of the Russian Football Union (RFU), the country is ready to spend some $10 billion on the tournament. The bid committee also includes RFU CEO Alexey Sorokin and Alexander Djordjadze as the Director of Bid Planning and Operations.  In October 2010, Russia formally pulled out of the race to host the 2022 FIFA World Cup. On December 2, 2010, Russia was chosen as the host country for the 2018 FIFA World Cup.

Fourteen cities are included in the current proposal, which divides them into 6 different clusters: one in the north, centered on St. Petersburg, a central cluster, centered on Moscow, a southern cluster, centered on Sochi, and the Volga River cluster. Only one city beyond the Ural Mountains is cited, Yekaterinburg. The other cities are: Kaliningrad in the north cluster, Rostov-on-Don and Krasnodar in the south cluster and Yaroslavl, Nizhny Novgorod, Kazan, Saransk, Samara and Volgograd in the Volga River cluster. The country does not currently have a stadium with 80,000 capacity, but the bid calls for the expansion of Luzhniki Stadium in Moscow, already a UEFA Elite stadium with a capacity of slightly over 78,000, to over 89,000 seats. Russia hopes to have five stadiums fit to host World Cup matches ready by 2013 — two in Moscow and one stadium each in St. Petersburg, Kazan and Sochi, which hosted the 2014 Winter Olympics.

In October 2011, Russia decreased the number of stadiums from 16 to 14. Construction of a proposed stadium in the Moscow region, Podolsk, was cancelled by the regional government, and Spartak Stadium is competing with Dinamo Stadium which will have been constructed first.

Schedule

Venues

Official Bid Partners
 Art and Sport foundation
 IFD Kapital Group of Companies
 BDO Russia
 Russian Law Firm Yust

References

External links
World Cup Russia 2018

Russia
Bid
2010 in Russian football